Callianax alectona is a species of small sea snail, marine gastropod mollusk in the family Olividae, the olives.

Description

Distribution
This species occurs in the Pacific Ocean off California.

References

  Chenu, 1844 - Parts 29-30. In Illustrations Conchyliologiques ou description et figures de toutes les coquilles connues vivantes et fossiles, classées suivant le système de Lamarck modifié d'après les progrès de la science et comprenant les genres nouveaux et les espèces récemment découvertes, p. Oliva pp 5-12 ; Pecten pl 49, 18, 19, 17, 27, 33, 47, 48 ; Spondylus pl 27, 30 ; Strombus pl 20, 27
 Powell II, C. L.; Vervaet, F.; Berschauer, D. (2020). A taxonomic review of California Holocene Callianax (Olivellidae:Gastropoda:Mollusca) based on shell characters. The Festivus. Supplement - special issue, 1-38.

External links
 Carpenter, P. P. (1864). Supplementary report on the present state of our knowledge with regard to the Mollusca of the west coast of North America. Reports of the British Association for the Advancement of Science. (1863) 33: 517-686
 Duclos, P. L. (1835-1840). Histoire naturelle générale et particulière de tous les genres de coquilles univalves marines a l'état vivant et fossile publiée par monographie. Genre Olive. Paris: Institut de France. 33 plates: pls 1-12
 Oldroyd, T.S. (1921). Some varieties of western Olivellas. The Nautilus. 34(4): 117-119, pl. 5
 Dall, W. H. (1910). New species of West American shells. The Nautilus. 23(11): 133-134

Olivellinae
Gastropods described in 1835